Bahun is a Varna among hill Khas of Nepal. Their origins are from the of Himalayan belt of South Asia.  According to the 2011 Nepal census, Bahun is the second most populous group after Chhetri, another Varna within the Hindus in Nepal.

According to 1854 Muluki Ain (Nepalese Legal Code), Bahuns were regarded as caste among sacred thread bearers (Tagadhari) and twice-born Hindus.

Origin 
Traditionally, Bahuns were members of the Hill Hindu community together with Chhetris and Pahadi/Hill Dalits. Possibly due to political power of the Khasa Malla kingdom, Bahun and Chhetris had high social status like plain Brahmins and Rajputs in the present-day western Nepal. Bahuns, regarded as upper class hill hindu group together with Chhetri, were associated mostly with the Gorkha Kingdom. Bahuns were original inhabitants of Karnali region of Nepal. .

Clans
Few Clans and Surnames as below 

 Adhikari 
 Arjel 
 Chaulagain
 Buddha Dahal
 Rupa kheti Dahal
 Poudel
 Banjara
 Baral
 Lamichhane
 Pokhrel 
 Subedi
 Siwakoti
 Bhatta
 Bhattarai
 Gautam
 Luitel

Demography
According to the 2011 Nepal census, Bahuns (referred as Hill-Brahmin) are the second most populous group after Khas Chhetri with 12.2% of Nepal's population (or 32,26,903 people). Bahun are the second largest Hindu group with a population of 3,212,704 (99.6% of Bahuns). Bahuns are the largest group in 15 districts in Nepal: Jhapa, Morang, Kathmandu, Chitwan, Nawalparasi, Rupandehi, Kaski, Syangja, Parbat, Gulmi and Arghakhanchi. Among these, Bahuns in Parbat (35.7%), Arghakhanchi (32.8%), Syangja (30.9%), Chitwan (28.6%), Kaski (27.8%) and Gulmi (25.2%) consist more than 25% of the district population. Kathmandu has largest Bahun population with 410,126 people (23.5%).

Bahuns have the highest civil service representation with 39.2% of Nepal's bureaucracy while having only 12.1% of Nepal's total population. The civil service representation to population ratio is 3.2 times for Bahuns which is fourth in Nepal. khas/Chhetris represent 1.6 times in civil services to their percentage of population, which is the highest in Nepal. As per the Public Service Commission, Brahmins (33.3%) and Chhetris (15.01%) were two largest caste group to obtain governmental jobs in F.Y. 2017-18 even though 45% governmental seats are reserved for women, Madhesis, other caste and Tibetan tribes, people with disability and those from the backward regions. Similarly, in the fiscal 2018–19, Bahuns (24.87%) and Chhetris (9.63%) maintained 35% of their proportion in civil service as per Public Service Commission.

Notable people
Madhav Prasad Devkota
Chabilal Upadhyaya
Ranga Nath Poudyal
Krishna Prasad Koirala and Koirala family
Matrika Prasad Koirala
Tanka Prasad Acharya
Bishweshwar Prasad Koirala
Girija Prasad Koirala
Krishna Prasad Bhattarai
Man Mohan Adhikari
KP Sharma Oli
Pushpa Kamal Dahal (Prachanda)
Madhav Kumar Nepal
Baburam Bhattarai

See also
Caste system in Nepal
Varna (Hinduism)

References

Bibliography
 

 
 
 

 
Brahmin communities of Nepal
Khas people
Brahmins
Brahmin communities
Gurkhas
Ethnic groups in Nepal
Ethnic groups in South Asia
Hindu ethnic groups
Hindu communities